The Todd Killings is a 1971 psychological thriller directed by Barry Shear and starring Robert F. Lyons, Richard Thomas, Belinda Montgomery, and Barbara Bel Geddes.  It is based on the true crimes of serial killer Charles Schmid in the 1960s.

Plot

Skipper Todd (Robert F. Lyons) is a ne'er-do-well who spends his time wanting to be a rock star and playing mentor to the local high school crowd while sponging off of his mother (Barbara Bel Geddes).  He is also the chief suspect in the disappearance of a local girl.  After befriending naive Billy Roy (Richard Thomas), Todd sets his sights on Roberta (Belinda Montgomery).

Cast
Robert F. Lyons as Skipper Todd 
Richard Thomas as Billy Roy 
Belinda Montgomery as Roberta 
Barbara Bel Geddes as Mrs. Todd 
James Broderick as Sam Goodwin 
Gloria Grahame as Mrs. Roy 
Harry Lauter as Mr. Roy
Holly Near as Norma 
Ed Asner as Fred Reardon 
Fay Spain as Mrs. Mack 
Michael Conrad as Detective Shaw

Release
The film was released theatrically in the United States by National General Pictures on October 20, 1971, although Warner Bros. bought the studio in 1969.

Home media
The film was released on VHS by Warner Home Video in 1993. It was released on DVD in 2010 via the Warner Archive on-demand service.  This release is anamorphic 2:35:1.

See also
 List of American films of 1971

References

External links 
 
 

1971 films
1971 horror films
1971 crime drama films
1970s crime thriller films
1971 LGBT-related films
1970s psychological thriller films
American crime drama films
American crime thriller films
American psychological horror films
American serial killer films
Crime films based on actual events
National General Pictures films
Films scored by Leonard Rosenman
Films directed by Barry Shear
1970s English-language films
1970s American films